Museum is a 2018 Mexican drama heist film directed by Alonso Ruizpalacios, and produced and written by Ruizpalacios and Manuel Alcalá. It was selected to compete for the Golden Bear in the main competition section at the 68th Berlin International Film Festival where it won the Silver Bear for Best Screenplay.

Plot
Two veterinary students, Juan Núñez (Gael García Bernal) and Benjamín Wilson (Leonardo Ortizgris), plan on robbing the National Museum of Anthropology in Mexico City and stealing precious Mayan, Mixtec, and Zapotec artifacts. While everyone celebrates Christmas in 1985, the two thieves manage to break inside the museum and steal hundreds of pieces of artifacts. They return home to see on the news how their deed is described as an attack on the entire nation, and realize that there is no turning back.

Cast
 Gael García Bernal as Juan Núñez 
 Leonardo Ortizgris as Benjamin Wilson
 Simon Russell Beale as Frank Graves
 Lynn Gilmartin as Gemma
 Alfredo Castro as Dr. Núñez
 Leticia Brédice as Sherezada

Reception

References

External links
 
 

2018 films
2018 drama films
Mexican drama films
2010s Spanish-language films
Films set in Mexico City
2010s heist films
2010s Mexican films